Malmgren is an unincorporated community in the Rural Municipality of Marriott No. 317 in Saskatchewan, Canada.

Malmgren belongs to the federal electoral district of Saskatoon—Rosetown—Biggar which was formerly known as Saskatoon—Rosetown.

References 

Unincorporated communities in Saskatchewan
M